Samuel Rose may refer to:

Samuel Rose (barrister) (1767–1804), an English barrister and editor
Samuel Rose (Philadelphia) (1911–1960), an American politician
Samuel Rose (artist), one of relatively few Hallgarten prize winners